The buff-throated sunbird (Chalcomitra adelberti) is a species of bird in the family Nectariniidae.  It is found in Benin, Cameroon, Ivory Coast, Ghana, Guinea, Guinea-Bissau, Liberia, Nigeria, Sierra Leone, and Togo.

References

buff-throated sunbird
Birds of West Africa
buff-throated sunbird
Taxonomy articles created by Polbot